Zsuzsa Kakuk (born August 13, 1925) is a Hungarian linguist and Turkologist.

Biography

Early life
Kakuk was born in Nagytálya, Hungary on August 13, 1925. At age eight, her family moved to Eger, then later relocated to Szatmárnémeti.

Academic career
Kakuk studied at the University of Debrecen from 1944 to 1949 and graduated with degrees in Hungarian and Latin. She went on to pursue a PhD in 1951 at Faculty of Humanities of the Eötvös Loránd University where she studied under Gyula Németh. She graduated in 1955. Kakuk worked at Eötvös Loránd University from 1955 until her retirement in 1995. During this period she was also engaged in work at the Institute of Linguistics at the Hungarian Academy of Sciences.

Kakuk's interest in Turkology began with an interest in Ottoman Turkish loanwords in Hungarian. Later work involved visiting Turkish-speaking communities throughout the Balkans to examine their dialects. Other work included compiling an anthology of early and medieval Turkic texts and studying the folklore of various Turkic-speaking groups, including the Kazan Tatars and Crimean Tatars. During a visit to China in 1960, Kakuk was able to gather materials on the Salar language and provided some of the earliest descriptions of the language in Western academic literature.

In 1984 Kakuk founded the Hungarian orientalist journal Keletkutatás ; she served as its editor-in-chief until 1994.

Selected publications

Academic service 
Vice President, Kőrösi Csoma Society (Hungarian Oriental Society), 1982-1988
Member, Hungarian Academy of Sciences
 Member, Linguistic Committee of the Ph.D. Commission of the Ministry of Education and Culture
 Editorial Board Member, Acta Linguistica Academiae Scientiarum Hungaricae
 Editorial Board member, Studia Turco-Hungarica

Recognition and honors
 Honorary Member, Türk Dil Kurumu, 1978
 Honoree,

Bibliography

References 

1925 births
Possibly living people
Turkologists
Linguists from Hungary
People from Heves County
Eötvös Loránd University alumni
Women linguists
University of Debrecen alumni
Academic staff of Eötvös Loránd University
20th-century linguists
Hungarian orientalists
Academic journal editors
Hungarian women editors
20th-century Hungarian women writers
Hungarian women academics
20th-century Hungarian educators
Hungarian editors
Linguists of Turkic languages
20th-century Hungarian writers